Neodesha  is a city in Wilson County, Kansas, United States.  As of the 2020 census, the population of the city was 2,275.  The name is derived from the Osage Indian word, Ni-o-sho-de, and is translated as The-Water-Is-Smoky-With-Mud.

History

19th century
The first settlers in the area that would eventually become Neodesha established a trading post in October 1867 to the northwest of the present town. They were allowed by the Osage Indians to establish a trading post on the Osage Diminished Reserve because the nearest trading post was over thirty miles away. After the Drum Creek Treaty had been signed by the Osage tribe in September 1870 and the tribe moved to Indian Territory; it opened the way for settlers to move to the area. Neodesha was incorporated March 2, 1871 and the original plat was filed with the U.S. Land Office in July 1871. Neodesha is an Osage name meaning "meeting of the waters".

The first railroad was built through Neodesha in 1879.

The first commercially successful oil well drilled in what would become the Mid-Continent Oil Field was drilled in Neodesha in 1892.  Norman No. 1 Oil Well was located in the southeast part of the city.  The Norman No. 1 Museum is near the location of the original wellsite.

20th century
In 1943, German and Italian prisoners of World War II were brought to Kansas and other Midwest states as a means of solving the labor shortage caused by American men serving in the war effort. Large internment camps were established in Kansas: Camp Concordia, Camp Funston (at Fort Riley), Camp Phillips (at Salina under Fort Riley). Fort Riley established 12 smaller branch camps, including Neodesha.

Geography
Neodesha is located at  (37.423512, -95.681185), along the Verdigris and Fall Rivers.

Climate
The climate in this area is characterized by hot, humid summers and generally mild to cool winters.  According to the Köppen Climate Classification system, Neodesha has a humid subtropical climate, abbreviated "Cfa" on climate maps.

Demographics

2010 census
As of the census of 2010, there were 2,486 people, 1,031 households, and 658 families residing in the city. The racial makeup of the city was 95.3% White, 0.4% African American, 1.1% Native American, 0.4% Asian, 0.6% from other races, and 2.1% from two or more races. Hispanic or Latino of any race were 2.9% of the population.

There were 1,031 households, of which 34.0% had children under the age of 18 living with them, 44.2% were married couples living together, 14.0% had a female householder with no husband present, 5.6% had a male householder with no wife present, and 36.2% were non-families. 32.1% of all households were made up of individuals, and 14.6% had someone living alone who was 65 years of age or older. The average household size was 2.37 and the average family size was 2.96.

The median age in the city was 39.2 years. 27% of residents were under the age of 18; 7.3% were between the ages of 18 and 24; 22.5% were from 25 to 44; 26.8% were from 45 to 64; and 16.5% were 65 years of age or older. The gender makeup of the city was 46.7% male and 53.3% female.

2000 census
As of the census of 2000, there were 2,848 people, 1,142 households, and 714 families residing in the city. The racial makeup of the city was 96.49% White, 0.35% African American, 0.67% Native American, 0.21% Asian, 0.84% from other races, and 1.44% from two or more races. Hispanic or Latino of any race were 2.11% of the population.

There were 1,142 households, out of which 33.1% had children under the age of 18 living with them, 48.6% were married couples living together, 10.6% had a female householder with no husband present, and 37.4% were non-families. 33.1% of all households were made up of individuals, and 16.9% had someone living alone who was 65 years of age or older. The average household size was 2.39 and the average family size was 3.07.

In the city, the population was spread out, with 27.6% under the age of 18, 8.1% from 18 to 24, 25.7% from 25 to 44, 18.9% from 45 to 64, and 19.8% who were 65 years of age or older. The median age was 37 years. For every 100 females, there were 89.2 males. For every 100 females age 18 and over, there were 81.3 males.

The median income for a household in the city was $26,042, and the median income for a family was $34,537. Males had a median income of $25,330 versus $17,191 for females. The per capita income for the city was $13,406. About 9.7% of families and 14.7% of the population were below the poverty line, including 18.3% of those under age 18 and 17.5% of those age 65 or over.

Education
The community is served by Neodesha USD 461 public school district. The Neodesha High School mascot is Bluestreaks.

Notable people
 Dorothy DeLay, violin instructor at Juilliard.
 Lyle Goodhue, scientist and aerosol pioneer, former Director of Research at Airosol Inc.
 Grimes Poznikov, street performer in San Francisco, California
 Clay T. Whitehead, director of the White House Office of Telecommunications Policy during Nixon Administration

References

Further reading

External links

City
 City of Neodesha
 Neodesha - Directory of Public Officials
Schools
 USD 461, local school district
Historical
 Neodesha in 1873 - From a Letter of William Hill, Pioneer Banker
 Photograph of Standard Oil Company refinery in Neodesha 1897
 Neodesha Memories Group on Facebook
Maps
 Neodesha city map, KDOT

Cities in Kansas
Cities in Wilson County, Kansas